is a Japanese professional basketball executive and former player, currently serving as the general manager of the Chiba Jets Funabashi of the Japanese B.League.  He played college basketball for Juntendo University. He was selected by the Oita Heat Devils with the 11th overall pick in the 2005 bj League draft. Sato's jersey number has been retired by the Jets.

Head coaching record

|-
| style="text-align:left;"|Chiba Jets
| style="text-align:left;"|2016
| 21||9||12|||| style="text-align:center;"| 8th in NBL|||-||-||-||
| style="text-align:center;"|-
|-

References

1982 births
Living people
Chiba Jets Funabashi coaches
Chiba Jets Funabashi players
Ehime Orange Vikings players
Japanese basketball coaches
Otsuka Corporation Alphas players